William David Tindall (May 29, 1921 – April 9, 2004) was a Canadian politician, who served as mayor of Victoria, British Columbia from 1979 to 1981. He was a veteran of World War II, serving in the Royal Canadian Air Force. Tindall was also an alderman on the Victoria City Council from 1971 until his election as mayor. He also worked as a manager at Eaton's.

References

Mayors of Victoria, British Columbia
1921 births
2004 deaths
Royal Canadian Air Force personnel of World War II
Victoria, British Columbia city councillors
20th-century Canadian politicians